Margalit (lit. pearl) is used in Israel as a surname and a female first name. Before the start of the First Aliyah the surname and first name was mainly used by the Sephardic Jews. It is related to Margulis, an East European Jewish name.  It may refer to:

Surname
 Avishai Margalit (born 1939), Israeli philosopher
 Dan Margalit (journalist) (born 1938), Israeli journalist, author and television host
 Itay Margalit (born 1970), retired Israeli high jumper
 Meir Margalit (born 1952), Argentine-born Israeli researcher of the history of the Jewish community in Mandatory Palestine and a founder of the Israeli Committee Against House Demolitions
 Meir Margalit (actor) (1906–1974), Israeli stage actor
 Erel Margalit (born 1961), Israeli politician and a high-tech and social entrepreneur
 Yanki Margalit  (born 1962), Israeli entrepreneur and speaker best known for starting Aladdin Knowledge Systems. He is currently Chairman of SCREEMO and SpaceIL
 Gilad Margalit (born 1959),  Israeli historian and writer, professor at the University of Haifa

First name
 Margalit Fox (born 1961), American author and writer for The New York Times
 Maggie Gyllenhaal (born 1977, as Margalit Ruth Gyllenhaal), American actress, half Ashkenazi Jewish descent
 Margalit Tzan'ani (born 1948), also known as Margol, Israeli singer and television personality
 Margalit Sharon (died 1962), first wife of Ariel Sharon
 Margalit Matitiahu (born 1935), Israeli poet in Ladino and Hebrew

See also
 Pearl (given name)
 Pearl (surname)
 Pearlman
 Perl (disambiguation)
Zhemchuzhina (disambiguation)

References

Hebrew-language surnames
Sephardic surnames